Ngaree Jane Ah Kit (born 4 June 1981) is an Australian politician, who was elected to the Northern Territory Legislative Assembly at the 2016 general election, representing the electoral division of Karama, Darwin, for the Labor Party.

Early life and background 
Ah Kit was born in Katherine, Northern Territory, and was raised in both Katherine and Darwin. She is of Aboriginal, Torres Strait Islander and Chinese descent, and is the daughter of Jack Ah Kit, the former Labor member for Arnhem, who was the first indigenous minister in the Northern Territory from 1995 to 2005. 
Following her brother's death in 2007, Ah Kit became a suicide prevention advocate, forming a survivors' group in 2007 and the Darwin Region Indigenous Suicide Prevention Network in 2010, and working for the Northern Territory Department of Health. 

She was a territory finalist for the Young Australian of the Year awards in 2009 for her work organising NAIDOC Week in the Top End, and a finalist for Australia's Local Hero in 2016 for her suicide prevention work. 

Ah Kit well known in the Northern Territory as a fierce and passionate advocate for First Nations community members, Disability and Multicultural Affairs has placed her well for her portfolios.  Ah Kit has also been involved in a number of community-controlled organisations serving as board director and spokesperson.

Political   
Ah Kit was sworn in as minister under the Fyles ministry in May 2022 following the resignation of then Chief Minister Michael Gunner. 

Ah Kit holds the portfolios of Minister for Corporate and Digital Development; Minister for Disabilities; Minister for International Education; Minister for Multicultural Affairs.

She was previously the 13th Speaker of the Northern Territory Legislative Assembly making her the first Aboriginal women to be speaker of an Australian parliament after being elected on 20 October 2020 following the resignation of Chansey Paech. Before that, she was Assistant Minister for Suicide Prevention, Mental Health, Disability, Youth and Seniors.

|}

References

1981 births
Living people
Members of the Northern Territory Legislative Assembly
Speakers of the Northern Territory Legislative Assembly
Australian Labor Party members of the Northern Territory Legislative Assembly
Indigenous Australian politicians
Women members of the Northern Territory Legislative Assembly
Australian politicians of Chinese descent
21st-century Australian politicians
21st-century Australian women politicians